The  is a four-lane toll road in Ibaraki Prefecture, Japan. It is owned and operated by East Nippon Expressway Company.

Route description
The route is officially designated as a bypass for National Route 6; however, it is functionally an extension from the eastern terminus of the Kita-Kantō Expressway.

History
The first section was opened to traffic in 1996. A bridge spanning the Naka River was completed in 1999, completing the route. The road was expanded from 2 to 4 lanes in 2000.

Junction list
The entire expressway is in Ibaraki Prefecture. The sequence of kilometer posts and exits continue from the eastern terminus of the Kita-Kantō Expressway.

See also

References

External links

 East Nippon Expressway Company

Toll roads in Japan
Roads in Ibaraki Prefecture
1996 establishments in Japan